Pokhari Chauri is a village development committee in Kavrepalanchok District in the Bagmati Zone of central Nepal. At the time of the 1991 Nepal census it had a population of 3,879 in 609 individual households. It lies in the border of Ramechhap and kavrepalanchowk district. It is about 80 km away from the capital of Nepal, Kathmandu

References

External links
UN map of the municipalities of Kavrepalanchowk District

Populated places in Kavrepalanchok District